Natan is a masculine given name, a surname and the Hebrew origin of the name Nathan which may refer to:

Given name:
 Natan Hockenstien (Also known as Nator Tots) (born 2008) Poet, Son, Entrepreneur
 Natan Bernot (1931-2018), Yugoslav slalom canoeist, 1963 World Championship C-2 silver medalist
 Natan Brand (1944–1990), Israeli classical pianist
 Natan Carneiro de Lima (born 1990), Brazilian footballer
 Natan Eidelman (1930-1989), Soviet Russian author and historian
 Natan Gamedze (born 1963), Swazi convert to Judaism, Haredi rabbi and lecturer
 Natan Jurkovitz (born 1995), French-Swiss-Israeli basketball player for Hapoel Be'er Sheva of the Israeli Basketball Premier League
 Natan Panz (1917–1948), Russian-born Jewish football player from Mandatory Palestine and Irgun member
 Natan Peled (1913-1992), Israeli politician
 Natan Rakhlin (1906-1979), Soviet orchestra conductor
 Natan or Nathan Rapoport (1911-1987), Polish Jewish sculptor and painter
 Natán Rivera (born 1998), Salvadoran pole vaulter
 Natan Rybak (1913-1978), Ukrainian poet and writer
 Natan Sharansky (born 1948), Soviet refusenik, Israeli politician, human rights activist and author
 Natan Slifkin (born 1975), British-born Israeli Orthodox rabbi, director of the Biblical Museum of Natural History in Beit Shemesh and controversial writer
 Natan Spigel (1886–1942), Polish Jewish painter
 Natan Yonatan (1923-2004), Israeli poet
 Natan or Nathan Zach (born 1930), Israeli poet
Surname:
 Bernard Natan (1886-1942), Franco-Romanian entrepreneur, film director and actor born Natan Tannenzaft
 Efrat Natan (born 1947), Israeli artist
 Émile Natan (1906–1962), Romanian-born French film producer, brother of Bernard Natan
 Shuli Natan (born 1947), Israeli singer

 Paul Natan, Belgian couturier, founder of the fashion house Natan.

See also
 Nathan (given name)

Masculine given names
Hebrew-language given names